"Rat Pack" is the 54th episode of the HBO original series The Sopranos and is the second of the show's fifth season. Written by Matthew Weiner and directed by Alan Taylor, it originally aired on March 14, 2004.

Starring
 James Gandolfini as Tony Soprano
 Lorraine Bracco as Jennifer Melfi *
 Edie Falco as Carmela Soprano
 Michael Imperioli as Christopher Moltisanti
 Dominic Chianese as Corrado Soprano, Jr. 
 Steven Van Zandt as Silvio Dante
 Tony Sirico as Paulie Gualtieri
 Robert Iler as Anthony Soprano, Jr. 
 Jamie-Lynn DiScala as Meadow Soprano
 Drea de Matteo as Adriana La Cerva
 Aida Turturro as Janice Soprano Baccalieri
 Steven R. Schirripa as Bobby Baccalieri
 Vincent Curatola as Johnny Sack 
 John Ventimiglia as Artie Bucco
 Steve Buscemi as Tony Blundetto

* = credit only

Guest starring
 Jerry Adler as Hesh Rabkin

Also guest starring
 Ray Abruzzo as Little Carmine
 Rae Allen as Aunt Quintina Blundetto
 David Copeland as Joey Cogo
 Patti D'Arbanville as Lorraine Calluzzo
 Robert Desiderio as Jack Massarone
 Vanessa Ferlito as Tina Francesco
 Lola Glaudini as Agent Deborah Ciccerone
 Tony Lip as Carmine Lupertazzi
 Robert Loggia as Michele "Feech" La Manna
 George Loros as Raymond Curto
 Frank Pando as Agent Grasso
 Frank Pellegrino as Bureau Chief Frank Cubitoso
 Joe Santos as Angelo Garepe
 Matt Servitto as Agent Harris
 Vinny Vella as Jimmy Petrille
 Frank Vincent as Phil Leotardo
 Karen Young as Agent Sanseverino
 Sharon Angela as Rosalie Aprile
 Maureen Van Zandt as Gabriella Dante
 Denise Borino as Ginny Sacrimoni
 Robert Funaro as Eugene Pontecorvo
 Joseph R. Gannascoli as Vito Spatafore
 Dan Grimaldi as Patsy Parisi
 Richard Maldone as Albert Barese
 Carl Capotorto as Little Paulie Germani
 Dan Castleman as Prosecutor Castleman
 Angelo Massagli as Bobby Baccalieri III
 Miryam Coppersmith as Sophia Baccalieri
 Frank Fortunato as Jason Evanina
 Scott Johnsen as Cop
 Joe Maruzzo as Joey Peeps

Synopsis
After Carmine dies, Little Carmine believes he is his father's successor, a claim dismissed by Johnny. Tony has a meeting with Jack Massarone, who presents him with a painting of the Rat Pack. Tony has known Massarone a long time, but does not know that he is now an FBI informant; the tip comes from a source of Patsy’s. Tony arranges another meeting and hugs Massarone, trying to find the wire, which is hidden in his baseball cap. He does not know what to think but realizes that Massarone said one thing out of key: he complimented Tony on losing weight. Tony spends a restless night, then drives to the Pulaski Skyway and tosses Massarone's painting into the river below. Massarone is found dead in the trunk of his car the next day.

Another informant, Soprano capo Ray Curto, visits FBI Headquarters to help agents correct a transcript of a meeting he recorded. A third informant, Adriana, is under pressure: "I am being ripped apart!" Her handler, Agent Sanseverino, tells her about the family tragedy that compelled her to join the Bureau and says they are "with the good guys now", but Adriana is not comforted. At an evening with Carmela and other wives, Adriana is racked with guilt, which is inflamed when Rosalie tells her that Big Pussy Bonpensiero's widow, Angie, is not welcome in their group because her husband was an informant. A tearful Adriana nearly admits the truth, but instead flees, and stumbles and hurts herself in the driveway. She refuses the women's offers of first aid and speeds away in her car. She then tells Sanseverino that her friend Tina, who has been flirting with Christopher, is embezzling money from the company where she works.

Tony greets Tony B after he is released from prison. At his welcome-home party at Nuovo Vesuvio, Tony tells the guests how important his cousin was in his life growing up. Tony B is disappointed that his ex-wife and twin sons are not there. There is some awkwardness when he seems to mock Tony's weight gain. Tony offers his cousin a place in a stolen airbag operation, but Tony B is not eager to get back in the business and seeks to go legitimate by becoming a state-licensed massage therapist. A disappointed Tony tells Christopher and Silvio that his cousin is "useless." He rebukes Tony B for making jokes about him, as he is now "the boss," and for giving massages in the office. However, in a late-night phone call, he seems to soften his tone and they reconcile.

First appearances
 Lorraine Calluzzo: loan shark working for the Lupertazzi crime family, also known as "Lady Shylock."
Jason Evanina: Lorraine Calluzzo's loan-sharking partner and lover.
 Tony Blundetto (first physical appearance): Tony's cousin and DiMeo/Soprano crime family member who was sent to federal prison in 1986 for hijacking a tractor-trailer.
Phil Leotardo (first physical appearance): Captain in the Lupertazzi crime family, recently released from prison after serving 20 years.

Deceased
Joseph "Joey" Cogo: killed offscreen in a payment dispute. Agent Sanseverino shows photos of his corpse to Adriana, who confirms his identity and having seen him previously with certain mob members.
Carmine Lupertazzi Sr.: died of complications due to stroke
Jack Massarone: killed for being an FBI informant. Massarone is found dead in the trunk of a car by FBI agents.

Title reference
 Jack Massarone gives Tony a painting of Frank Sinatra, Dean Martin and Sammy Davis, Jr, who were all members of the "Rat Pack."
 The three informants are all "rats."
 Junior refers to the newly released ex-cons as "the Class of 2004, old rats on a new ship."

References to other media
 The wiretap recording that Ray Curto is helping the FBI transcribe is from the capos meeting in "For All Debts Public and Private."
 Paulie quotes from Sun Tzu's The Art of War, mispronouncing the author's name as "Sun-Ta-Zu," confusing Tony Blundetto until corrected by Silvio.  He also mistakenly refers to Sun Tzu as "the Chinese Prince Matchabelli" instead of Niccolò Machiavelli, the author of The Prince. Prince Matchabelli is a line of perfumes. Tony Soprano also uses this Matchabelli malapropism in Season 3, Episode 8 during his therapy session.
 In one scene, Tony is shown watching a tearful recollection by WWII veteran Edward Heffron in "Points," the final episode of the HBO mini-series Band of Brothers.
 Tony Blundetto jokingly calls Paulie Grandpa Munster (from The Munsters) because of his hair.
 Tony Blundetto does an impression of Jackie Gleason's character Reginald Van Gleason III from The Jackie Gleason Show.
 At Carmela's house, due to Tony's removing the media system, the women enjoy snacks and wine instead of watching Casablanca. The next movie on AFI's 100 Years...100 Movies list is The Godfather.
 Before watching Citizen Kane, Carmela reads the review of the film from Leonard Maltin's Movie Guide.
 Artie asks Tony B "Where's Tubs" in regard to his outfit at his welcoming home party.  A nod to the cop show Miami Vice which was popular during the time of Tony Bs arrest

Reference to real events
After Carmine Lupertazzi dies, Bobby mentions that he had heard Carmine invented point shaving. To this, Uncle Junior nostalgically recalls, "CCNY versus Kentucky, 1951. Nobody beat the spread, I bought a black Fleetwood." This refers to the actual CCNY Point Shaving Scandal of 1950-1951.

Music
 Roy Orbison's "Crying", and "It Hurts to Be in Love," by Gene Pitney both play in the diner during the first scene.
 In the coffee shop scene between Adriana and Agent Sanseverino, "The Way It Is" by Bruce Hornsby and the Range can be heard playing in the background.
 "Walk With Me" by Felix Da Housecat is playing in the background in the first scene between Adriana, Christopher, and Tina at the Crazy Horse. In a later scene, "She Will Be Loved" by Maroon 5 is playing.
 "Canzona in D Minor" (BWV 588) by Johann Sebastian Bach is playing at Carmine Lupertazzi's wake.
 Tony Blundetto's cellphone ringtone is Queen's "We Are the Champions"
 Dean Martin singing "Powder Your Face With Sunshine (Smile Smile Smile)" is playing at Nuovo Vesuvio when the Tonys arrive together.
 The song played over the end credits is "Undercover of the Night" by The Rolling Stones.

External links
"Rat Pack"  at HBO

The Sopranos (season 5) episodes
2004 American television episodes